Shankardev Shishu Vidya Niketan, Bhuragaon is a non-governmental school in Bhuragaon under Shishu Shiksha Samiti, Assam. The school was founded on 31 January 2004. There are currently 13 teachers (Acharyas) and 350 students in the Niketan.

Geographical
This place was set up at Bhuragaon Panchali.

History
This school was established on 31 January 2004 by some people of Bhuragaon

Current
Academic performance of a school can also be judged from the point of view Final Examination of class 10th standard. Our schools are under the Board of Secondary Education, Assam. The students have to appear in the final examination conducted by Board, All Assam basis at class X. The Final Examination is known as High School Leaving Certificate Examination.

Since 2014 the Final Examination Result of our school is very good which can be depict from the past years performance by our students.

Facilities

Governing body

Teaching system

Moral and Spiritual Education
Moral and Spiritual Education have a link in all the subjects of schools. In fact it is not a subject but an educational reformation. Stress has been given by the Vidya Bharati to uplift the children of schools by this education. And for all the Acharyas it is an important subject to be taught to the children. It is the aim of Vidya Bharati that all the Acharyas pay attention in the subject which is also included in the curriculum.

Sharirik Shiksha(Physical Training)
The aim of physical education is to develop the healthy atmosphere, a better and nice environment to our children. By this children will develop their good manners and good behavior. To make the physical education a success the Vidya Bharati has implemented many programmes such as health education, health cheek up, games and sports and gymnastics.

Co-Curricular Activities
To make our students enlightened citizens of Bharat, the Shishu Shiksha Samiti lay equal stress on extra curricular and Co-curricular activities. The Co-curricular activities enable the students to understand his / her responsibilities towards the society. It includes tree plantation. Social service, Sanskar Yojana, Shishu Sanmalon, Cultural Competition, Gosh Training etc. In addition to the above there are some compulsory programmes in each Niketan for one day in the year as a part of Co-curricular activities, such as Sanskrit Day (February), English Day (March), Hindi Day (April), Brilliant Student Day (May) etc.

Yoga/Music/Sanskrit Education
According to Bharatiya Culture the Vidya Bharati has implemented Yoga education in the schools. It is important to noted that by this education the organization has taken a bold step to make our children talent, intelligent and spiritually develop.

To enrich the creativity and cheerfulness among the children Music has also been introduced in our school curriculum.

In Bharatiya Culture Sanskrit Language is called the language of gods. By the utterance of this language the Bharatiya people belonged to Hindu Community great strength. Sanskrit language is a scientific language. The Vidya Bharati has introduced the language in the curriculum from class II to class VII in the schools to strengthen our children potential.

Photo Gallery

References

Schools in Assam
Educational institutions established in 2004
2004 establishments in Assam